Benjamin Shapira (10 June 1913 – 1993) was an Israeli biochemist.

Biography 
Benjamin Shapira was born in Germany in 1913. His family immigrated to British Mandate of Palestine in 1926 and settled in Afula. He studied at the Hebrew University of Jerusalem from 1933 and obtained a BSc in natural sciences in 1937. In 1940, he was awarded a PhD.

Awards 
 In 1955, Shapira was awarded the Israel Prize, for medical science.

See also 
List of Israel Prize recipients
Shapira

References 

Hebrew University of Jerusalem alumni
Israel Prize in medicine recipients
Israeli scientists
German emigrants to Mandatory Palestine
20th-century German Jews
Jews in Mandatory Palestine
People from Afula
1913 births
1993 deaths